Itay Shanny (born 1 September 1998) is an Israeli archer.

He represented Israel at the 2020 Summer Olympics competing in the  men's individual event. Shanny was seeded 60th out of 64 in the ranking round.
 That rank placed him against 5th seeded Japanese Hiroki Muto in the first round. Shanny got the upset victory, beating his opponent 7–3. In the second round, facing 37th seed Indian Tarundeep Rai, Shanny won the match with a 10–9 single arrow shoot-off after the match was tied 5–5, advancing to the round of 16. There, he lost by a score of 6–5 to Taiwan's Tang Chih-chun and was eliminated from the competition.

References

External links
 
 

1998 births
Living people
Israeli male archers
Olympic archers of Israel
Archers at the 2020 Summer Olympics
Place of birth missing (living people)
European Games competitors for Israel
Archers at the 2019 European Games